ALWC may refer to:

 A.L. Williams Corporation, a predecessor company of Primerica, an American life insurance and financial services company
 Accelerated low-water corrosion, the fast corrosion of steel or other materials in seawater near the low tide mark due to microbes
 American League Wild Card Game, an annual playoff game in Major League Baseball